Merchant M. Mahoney, CBE (died May 4, 1946) was a Canadian diplomat who served as Canada's unofficial representative to the United States and High Commissioner to Ireland.

Born in New York State of Canadian parents, Mahoney went to the United States in 1916 with the Imperial Munitions Board, transferring to the Canadian War Mission two years later. When the War Mission was wound down in 1921, Mahoney was appointed Canada's agent to the United States of America, pending further arrangements. As agent, he was provided with an office within the British Embassy in Washington D. C., but had no official status. In 1927, when the Canadian Legation was established, Mahoney was appointed Commercial Secretary. He was appointed a CBE in 1935.

Mahoney was appointed Canada's High Commissioner to Éire (Ireland) in 1945 but died a year later in Dublin.

References 

 https://w05.international.gc.ca/HeadsOfPost/Results-Resultats.aspx?lang=eng&prsn=600
 https://www.nytimes.com/1946/05/05/archives/m-mahoney-dead-canadian-envoy59-high-commissioner-to-eire-on.html
 Power, Personalities, and Policies: Essays in Honour of Donald Cameron Watt (1992)

1946 deaths
Canadian diplomats
Canadian Commanders of the Order of the British Empire